Wenchang Temple is a common name given to temples dedicated to Wenchang Wang, the Chinese deity of culture and literature. Temples with the name include:
 Beitun Wenchang Temple in Beitun District, Taichung, Taiwan
 Miaoli Wenchang Temple in Miaoli City, Miaoli County, Taiwan
 Jhen Wen Academy, formerly known as Wenchang Temple, in Xiluo Township, Yunlin County, Taiwan

See also 
 Wen Chang (disambiguation)